Tie Plant is an unincorporated community located in Grenada County, Mississippi and part of the Grenada Micropolitan Statistical Area. Although an unincorporated community, Tie Plant has a zip code of 38960.

The community was named for the production of railroad ties near the original town site.

References

Unincorporated communities in Grenada County, Mississippi
Unincorporated communities in Mississippi